A mass shooting occurred in Kajzerica, Zagreb, Croatia, at 9:30 pm on 1 August 2019. The perpetrator, Igor Nađ killed six people.

Shooting
The shooting took place on August 1, 2019. At the beginning of that day at 9:30, Nađ went to a bar where he drank Pelinkovac. At 10:00, he arrived at his hairdresser in Vrbik, where he had been going to cut his hair cut for years. Witnesses say he was in a good mood. At 10:30 following the haircut, he went to a nearby cafe. Before leaving the cafe, he had been quoted as telling a friend, “This is the last time you see me.” It is not known what he did between leaving the cafe and starting firing. At 21:10, he arrived on Cimermanova 2 street where Maja Tojagić, his former girlfriend lived. At 21:15, he encountered Maja's 10-year-old son Paul and sent him to see who was in the house. 21:21, he shot 6 people in the house, leaving a baby who was in the house alive. At 21:30, he fled the scene via car from the Kajzerica district to the Brezovica district, where his mother resided. The police were able to trace him via his mobile phone and came to his location. On August 2, at about 3:00, surrounded by police, he committed suicide in the backyard of the Caritas Home for Orphans.

Victims
Six people died during the attack. The victims were Dragomir Tojagić (61) and Filjka Tojagić (63), parents of Maja Tojagić and Josipa Tojagić; Josipa Tojagić (29) and her boyfriend Davor Paušak (29); and Maja Tojagić (35) and her son (10) from a previous marriage with a man named Paulo Zamboni.

Perpetrator
Igor Nađ was born on August 31, 1983 in Vukovar. After birth, he lived in Petrovci. After the start of the Croatian War of Independence in 1991, his family fled to Zagreb, where they were accommodated at the International Hotel. He attended elementary school in the Vrbik district. Nađ later worked as an Uber driver. On July 16, 2016 near a bar in Trešnjevka, Nađ hit a man, and was fined 500 kunas for it. Nađ dated Maja Tojagić for three years until May 2019. After the birth of their son in May 2019, they broke up.

References 

2019 mass shootings in Europe
2019 murders in Europe
2019 shooting
21st-century mass murder in Europe
August 2019 crimes in Europe
2019 shooting
Family murders
Mass murder in 2019
Mass murder in Croatia
Murder–suicides in Croatia
Mass shootings in Croatia
2019 suicides
August 2019 events in Croatia
2019 crimes in Croatia
2010s murders in Croatia